Urticicola is a genus of air-breathing land snails, terrestrial pulmonate gastropod mollusks in the subfamily Trochulininae  of the family Hygromiidae, the hairy snails and their allies.

Species
Species within the genus Urticicola include:
 Urticicola glabellus (Draparnaud, 1801) – type species
 Urticicola isaricus (Locard, 1882)
 Urticicola mounierensis (Caziot, 1909)
 Urticicola moutonii (Dupuy, 1847)
  Urticicola perchtae  Salvador, 2013 – Middle Miocene, Germany
 † Urticicola schlickumi H. Nordsieck, 2014 
 Urticicola suberinus (Bérenguier, 1882)
 Urticicola umbrosus (Pfeiffer, 1828)
Synonyms
 Urticicola ventouxiana (L. Forcart, 1946): synonym of Urticicola isaricus ventouxianus (Forcart, 1946)

References

 Bank, R. A.; Neubert, E. (2017). Checklist of the land and freshwater Gastropoda of Europe. Last update: July 16th, 2017.

External links

Hygromiidae
Gastropod genera
Taxa named by Wassili Adolfovitch Lindholm